The IEEE Andrew S. Grove Award is a Technical Field Award presented  by the IEEE for outstanding contributions to solid-state devices and technology. The award may be presented to an individual or a team of up to three people. It was established by the IEEE Board of Directors in 1999.  The award is named in honor of the lifetime achievements of Andrew S. Grove, including helping to found Intel Corporation.

Recipients of this award receive a bronze medal, certificate and honorarium.

Recipients
Source

References

External links 
 IEEE Andrew S. Grove Award page at IEEE

Andrew S. Grove Award